The National Solidarity Party of Afghanistan ( Hezb-e-Paiwand Mili Afghanistan, Paiwand Milli, Paiwand Mili) is a political party representing the Afghanistan's Ismaili Shia minority, largely found in Kabul Province, Baghlan Province, Bamyan Province, Balkh Province and Badakhshan province. As recently as 2008 it was one of 84 political parties registered with the Afghan Ministry of Justice, and headed by Sayed Mansur Naderi (or "Nadiri").

Estimates of congressmen in the Wolesi Jirga affiliated with the Paiwand-e-milli range from 2 in 2005  to 1 in 2006  and 4 in 2010 which includes Sayed Mansur Naderi, Farkhunda Zahra Naderi, Sayed Dawood Naderi and Ramazan Jumazada.

National Solidarity Party of Afghanistan endorsed Ashraf Ghani Ahmadzai in the 2014 presidential election which led to Ashraf Ghani Ahmadzai's success.

The National Solidarity Party of Afghanistan has introduced Sadat Mansoor Naderi as the nominee for the ministry of Urban Development, who will soon be introduced to Afghan National Assembly to get MPs vote.

References

Shia Islamic political parties in Afghanistan
Ismailism in Afghanistan
Political parties in Afghanistan
Baghlan Province
Political parties of minorities